Toby James Stevenson (born 22 November 1999) is an English professional footballer who plays as a defender for Billericay Town.

Career
Born in Colchester, Essex, Stevenson started his career in the youth team of Leyton Orient. In November 2017 he was sent out on a work-experience loan to Isthmian League North Division side Heybridge Swifts. He made his debut against Kingstonian in a 2–2 draw in the FA Trophy. He went on to make twenty-three appearances for the Essex side, where he stayed until 2018. In May 2018, Orient announced that he would not be offered a professional contract following the end of his scholarship, although manager Martin Ling stated that he would have been retained if the club still had an under-23 team. 

He subsequently joined Charlton Athletic development squad after impressing on trial against Crystal Palace in the under-18 play-off final. On 10 October 2018 he became the first Charlton player to score a hat-trick on debut following the record 8–0 win away at Stevenage in the EFL Trophy. He went onto make another six appearances that season as Charlton were promoted to the EFL Championship following the play-off victory over Sunderland. In May 2019, Charlton announced that his contract had been extended by a further year. On 2 November 2019 he was sent out on loan to National League side Dagenham & Redbridge on a one-month youth loan and made his debut on that day in a 2–1 away defeat to Solihull Moors. His loan was extended on 5 December 2019 until 11 January 2020. On 3 January 2020, Stevenson was recalled by Charlton.

On 2 July 2020, it was confirmed that Stevenson had left Charlton after his contract expired. Stevenson signed a one-year deal with Watford on 15 September, with the option of a further year. 

Following his release from Watford, Stevenson joined National League side Bromley and subsequently joined Braintree Town on a month's loan at the end of September, where he made his debut in a 6–0 defeat to Eastbourne Borough on 25 September 2021.

On Tuesday 26th October 2021 Toby joined Billericay Town on a one month loan.

On 31 May 2022, it was confirmed that Stevenson would leave Bromley following the end of his contract.

On 15 July 2022, Stevenson rejoined Billericay Town on a permanent contract.

Career statistics

Honours
Billericay Town
Essex Senior Cup: 2021–22

References

English footballers
1999 births
Living people
Association football defenders
Leyton Orient F.C. players
Heybridge Swifts F.C. players
Charlton Athletic F.C. players
Dagenham & Redbridge F.C. players
Watford F.C. players
Bromley F.C. players
Braintree Town F.C. players
Billericay Town F.C. players
English Football League players
National League (English football) players
Isthmian League players
Sportspeople from Colchester